Love Actually is a 2003 Christmas romantic comedy film written and directed by Richard Curtis. It features an ensemble cast, composed predominantly of British actors, many of whom had worked with Curtis in previous film and television projects. Mostly filmed on location in London, the screenplay delves into different aspects of love as shown through 10 separate stories involving a variety of individuals, many of whom are shown to be interlinked as the plot progresses. The story begins five weeks before Christmas and is played out in a weekly countdown until the holiday, followed by an epilogue that takes place one month later.

An international co-production between the United Kingdom, the United States and France, the film was released in the United States on 14 November 2003 and a week later in the United Kingdom, to generally mixed reviews. Love Actually was a box-office success, grossing $246 million worldwide on a budget of $40–45 million. It received a nomination for the Golden Globe Award for Best Motion Picture – Musical or Comedy. Frequently shown during the Christmas season, the film has proved more popular with audiences than critics, and it has been discussed as being arguably a modern-day Christmas staple.

A made-for-television short film sequel, Red Nose Day Actually, aired in two different versions on BBC One and NBC in 2017.

Plot
A voiceover opens the film, commenting that whenever he gets gloomy about the state of the world, he thinks of the arrivals gate at Heathrow Airport, about the pure uncomplicated love of friends and families welcoming their loved ones. He also points out that the messages from the 9/11 victims were messages of love and not hate. The story then switches between the interconnecting "love stories" of many people:

Billy Mack and Joe
With his long-time manager Joe, rock and roll legend Billy Mack records a Christmas version of the Troggs' 1967 song "Love Is All Around", titling it "Christmas Is All Around". Although believing the record is terrible, Mack promotes the release in the hope it will become the Christmas number one single, which it does. He foregoes a victory party hosted by Elton John to celebrate Christmas with Joe, getting drunk and watching porn.

Juliet, Peter and Mark
Juliet and Peter's wedding is videotaped by the best man, Mark, where a surprise band plays the Beatles' "All You Need Is Love" as they walk out of the church. Although the couple believe Mark dislikes Juliet, he is actually in love with her. When he evades her requests to see the video he shot at the wedding, she shows up at his flat. Juliet insists she wants them to be friends, but when she views the wedding video Mark recorded, she sees many extreme close-ups of herself and few of Peter's face. She realises Mark's true feelings towards her. After an uncomfortable silence, Mark blurts out that he acts cold out of "self-preservation".

On Christmas Eve, Juliet answers the doorbell to find Mark carrying a boombox playing a Christmas carol and large cue cards. While Peter is inside watching television, Mark tells a message of his love to Juliet through the cue cards. As he walks away down the street, Juliet runs after him, gives him a quick kiss and returns inside.

Jamie and Aurélia
Writer Jamie is pushed by his girlfriend to attend Juliet and Peter's wedding alone, as she is ill. He returns before the reception to check on her, discovering she is having sex with his brother. Crushed, Jamie withdraws to his French cottage, where he meets Portuguese housekeeper Aurélia, who does not speak English. Despite not sharing a common language, they share a mutual attraction.

Jamie returns to England, realises he is in love with Aurélia and begins learning Portuguese. He returns to France to find her and ends up walking through town with her father and sister, gathering additional people as they walk to her waitressing job. In basic, and often grammatically incorrect Portuguese, he declares his love for her and proposes. She says yes in broken English, showing she too had been studying English "just in cases", as the crowd erupts in applause.

Harry, Karen and Mia
Harry is the managing director of a design agency. Mia is his secretary. Harry is happily married to Karen, a stay-at-home mother. They have two children, Bernard and Daisy. Mia behaves in an overtly sexual way with him at the office and asks him for a Christmas present. At the company Christmas party held at Mark's gallery, they dance closely.

While Christmas shopping, Harry calls Mia and asks what she wants for Christmas. He is almost caught by his wife purchasing an expensive necklace with a gold heart pendant from the jewellery department when the salesman Rufus takes an inordinate amount of time to wrap it. Later, Karen finds the necklace in Harry's coat pocket and assumes it is for her. Opening a similarly shaped box on Christmas Eve, she is heartbroken to find it is a Joni Mitchell CD and realises he bought the necklace for someone else and cries in her bedroom alone. She keeps a happy face as not to ruin her family's holiday. She confronts Harry and asks what he would do if he were her. She feels he has made a mockery of their marriage and of her.

David and Natalie
David, who is Karen's brother, is also the recently elected Prime Minister of the United Kingdom. Natalie is a new junior member of the household staff at 10 Downing Street. During a meeting with the U.S. President, they come across Natalie and the president makes some inappropriate comments to David about her. Later, David walks in on Natalie serving tea and biscuits to the President, and it appears that something untoward is happening. Natalie seems embarrassed, and the president has a sly grin on his face. At the following joint press conference, David is uncharacteristically assertive while taking a stand against the President's intimidation techniques.

Feeling uncomfortable around Natalie, David has her moved to another position. However, he is spurred to action on Christmas Eve when he finds a Christmas card from her in his red box, declaring that she is his and only his. He finds her after a door-to-door search of her street. Her entire family is on their way to a multi-school Christmas play and he offers to drive them so he can talk to her. As Natalie sneaks him into the school, he runs into his heartbroken sister, Karen, who believes he is there for his niece and nephew. As David and Natalie try to keep from being seen and watch from backstage, they finally kiss. Everyone sees them kissing as the curtain rises.

Daniel, Sam, Joanna and Carol
Daniel, Karen's close friend, mourns the recent death of his wife, Joanna, as he tries to care for his stepson Sam. Sam has fallen for an American classmate, also named Joanna, and after talking with his stepfather, decides to learn the drums to accompany her in the big finale for their school's Christmas pageant at Karen and Harry's children's school. Sam feels he has missed his chance to impress her, but Daniel convinces him to try to tell Joanna how he feels at the airport before she returns to the US. Sam slips through airport security and catches up with her. She acknowledges him by name which surprises him. Sam returns to Daniel to tell him and Joanna follows him surprising him again and kisses him on the cheek. Meanwhile, Daniel meets Carol, the mother of Sam's schoolmate, and there is a mutual spark.

Sarah, Karl and Michael
Sarah first appears at Juliet and Peter's wedding, sitting next to her friend Jamie. An American working at Harry's graphic design company, she is in love with the creative director, Karl. Prompted by Harry, they finally connect at the Christmas party and Karl drives her home. Michael, her mentally ill brother, telephones from a psychiatric hospital, aborting their tryst. On Christmas Eve they are both working late. Karl tries to find words but just wishes her a merry Christmas and leaves. In tears, Sarah calls Michael and visits him to give him a Christmas gift.

Colin, Tony and the American girls
Unsuccessfully attempting to woo various English women, including Mia and Nancy, Juliet and Peter's wedding caterer, Colin Frissell informs his friend Tony that he plans to go to America, convinced that his Britishness will be an asset. Landing in Milwaukee, Wisconsin, Colin meets Stacey, Jeannie and Carol-Anne, three stunningly attractive women who instantly fall for his Estuary English accent, inviting him to stay at their home, where they are joined by their roommate Harriet.

John and Judy
John and Judy are professional stand-ins for films. They meet doing the sex scenes for a film for which Tony is a production assistant. John tells Judy that "It's lovely to find someone [he] can actually chat to." While they are perfectly comfortable being naked and simulating sex on-set, they are shy and tentative off-set. They carefully pursue a relationship, attending the Christmas pageant (involving David and Natalie, Harry and Karen's children, Daniel and Sam, etc.) at the local school with John's brother. They get engaged by the end of the film.

Rufus
Rufus is the jewellery salesman whose meticulous gift-wrapping nearly results in Karen seeing Harry buying a necklace for Mia. In another scene, his distraction of airport staff enables Sam to sneak past them to talk to Joanna. (In the director and cast commentary, it is revealed that Rufus was originally supposed to be a Christmas angel, but this was dropped from the final script.)

Epilogue
One month later, all the characters are seen at Heathrow Airport. Billy's Christmas single has spurred a comeback. Juliet, Peter and Mark meet Jamie and his bride, Aurélia. Karen and the kids greet Harry, but Karen's stifled reaction suggests they are struggling to move past his indiscretion. Sam greets Joanna, who has returned from America, and Daniel is joined by his new girlfriend Carol and her son. Newlyweds John and Judy, heading off to their honeymoon, run into Tony, who is awaiting Colin's return from America. Colin returns with Harriet and her sister Carla, who meets Tony for the first time, but greets him with a hug and a kiss on the lips. Natalie welcomes David back from his flight in view of the press, showing their relationship is now public. These scenes dissolve into footage of actual arrivals at Heathrow, as the screen is divided into an increasing number of smaller segments which form the shape of a heart.

Story association

All the stories are linked in some way; while Billy Mack and his manager may not connect with any of the other characters physically, Billy appears frequently on characters' radios and TVs, his music video twice providing an important plot device for Sam's pursuit of Joanna, and they also cross paths with the other characters in the closing Heathrow scene. John and Judy work with Tony, who is best friends with Colin, who works for a catering company that services the office where Sarah, Karl, Mia and Harry work. Mia is friends with Mark, who runs the art gallery where the Christmas office party takes place. Mia also lives next door to Natalie. Mark is in love with Juliet and friends with Peter. The couple is friends with Jamie and Sarah. Harry is married to Karen, who is friends with Daniel and her brother is David, who works with Natalie. Harry and Karen's children (and thus David's niece and nephew), Natalie's siblings (and thus Mia's neighbours) and Carol's son are all schoolmates of Sam and Joanna. An additional plot that was dropped in editing concerned the children's headmistress (Anne Reid) and her dying lesbian partner (Frances de la Tour).

Cast

 Alan Rickman as Harry
 Emma Thompson as Karen
 Hugh Grant as David, the Prime Minister
 Keira Knightley as Juliet
 Colin Firth as Jamie
 Sienna Guillory as Jamie's girlfriend
 Lúcia Moniz as Aurélia
 Liam Neeson as Daniel
 Thomas Sangster as Sam
 Bill Nighy as Billy Mack
 Gregor Fisher as Joe
 Martine McCutcheon as Natalie
 Chiwetel Ejiofor as Peter
 Andrew Lincoln as Mark
 Laura Linney as Sarah
 Rodrigo Santoro as Karl
 Michael Fitzgerald as Michael
 Kris Marshall as Colin
 Abdul Salis as Tony
 Heike Makatsch as Mia
 Martin Freeman as John
 Joanna Page as Judy
 Olivia Olson as Joanna
 Billy Bob Thornton as the U.S. President
 Rowan Atkinson as Rufus
 Claudia Schiffer as Carol
 Nina Sosanya as Annie
 Ivana Miličević as Stacey
 January Jones as Jeannie
 Elisha Cuthbert as Carol-Anne
 Shannon Elizabeth as Harriet
 Denise Richards as Carla
 Lulu Popplewell as Daisy
 Marcus Brigstocke as Mikey
 Julia Davis as Nancy
 Ruby Turner as Jean
 Adam Godley as Mr Trench
 Élisabeth Margoni as Eleonore
Edward Hardwicke as	Sam's Grandfather
Caroline John as Sam's Grandmother
 Meg Wynn Owen as Mary, PM's secretary

Production

Development

Initially, Curtis started writing with two distinct and separate films in mind, each featuring expanded versions of what would eventually become storylines in Love Actually: those featuring Hugh Grant and Colin Firth. He changed tack, however, having become frustrated with the process. Partly inspired by the films of Robert Altman as well as films such as Pulp Fiction, and inspired by Curtis having become "more interested in writing a film about love and what love sort of means" he had the idea of creating an ensemble film. The film initially did not have any sort of Christmas theme, although Curtis's penchant for such films eventually caused him to write it as one.

Curtis's original concept for the film included fourteen different scenarios, but four of them were cut (two having been filmed). The scene in which Colin attempts to chat up the female caterer at the wedding appeared in drafts of the screenplay for Four Weddings and a Funeral, but was cut from the final version. The music video for Billy Mack's song, "Christmas Is All Around", is a tribute to Robert Palmer's 1986 video, "Addicted to Love". Curtis has spoken negatively about the editing process for the film, which he labelled in 2014 as a "catastrophe" and "the only nightmare scenario that I've been caught in". The film was rushed in order to be ready for the 2003 Christmas season which he likened to "three-dimensional chess". For the scene in which Rowan Atkinson's character Rufus annoys Harry, Alan Rickman's reaction was reportedly genuine, having been "driven insane" by the time constraints. Hugh Grant disliked filming the dance scene as he called it "excruciating" and "absolute hell".

Casting
Ant & Dec played themselves in the film with Bill Nighy's character referring to Dec as "Ant or Dec". This refers to the common mistaking of one for the other, owing to their constant joint professional presence as a comedy and presenting duo. The veteran actress Jeanne Moreau is seen briefly, entering a taxi at the Marseille Airport. The soul singer Ruby Turner appears as Joanna Anderson's mother, one of the backing singers at the school Christmas pageant.

Curtis cast his daughter Scarlett in the film; she was given the choice of being an angel or a lobster, and played the part of Lobster number 2 in the nativity play, on the condition that she met Keira Knightley.

Helder Costa plays Mr Barros, Aurelia's father. He is a veteran actor in Portuguese cinema.

Joe Alwyn auditioned for the part of Daniel's son Sam, which eventually went to Thomas Brodie-Sangster.

Curtis originally had two actors in mind for the part of Billy Mack, but then told casting director Mary Selway to find someone who’d do the part well but whom he would never think to cast; she suggested Bill Nighy.

Locations
Most of the film was made on location in London, including Trafalgar Square, the central court of Somerset House in the Strand, Grosvenor Chapel on South Audley Street near Hyde Park, St Paul's Church, Clapham, the Millennium Bridge, Selfridges department store on Oxford Street, Lambeth Bridge, the Tate Modern in the former Bankside Power Station, Canary Wharf, Marble Arch, St. Luke's Mews off All Saint's Road in Notting Hill, Chelsea Bridge, the OXO Tower, London City Hall, Poplar Road in Herne Hill, Elliott School in Pullman Gardens, Putney, Heathrow Airport and the Marseille Airport. Scenes set in 10 Downing Street were filmed at Shepperton Studios.

Standing up to the US President
Following Tony Blair's resignation as Prime Minister, pundits and speculators commented on a potential anti-American shift in Gordon Brown's cabinet as a "Love Actually moment", referring to the scene in which Hugh Grant's character stands up to the US President. In 2009, during President Barack Obama's first visit to the UK, Chris Matthews referred to the president in Love Actually as an example of George W. Bush and other former presidents' bullying of European allies. Commenting on this, Mediaite's Jon Bershad described the U.S. president character as a "sleazy Bill Clinton/George W. Bush hybrid". In the scene in question, the swaggering president bullies the prime minister and then sexually harasses a member of the household staff. In September 2013, David Cameron made a speech in reply to Russia's comment that Britain was a small insignificant country, which drew comparisons with Hugh Grant's speech during the film.

Soundtrack

US version
The US edition of the soundtrack removed two pieces of score and "Sometimes" by Gabrielle and reordered the tracklist. It also replaced the Girls Aloud cover of "Jump (For My Love)" with the original by The Pointer Sisters, and replaced Maroon 5's "Sweetest Goodbye" with a medley of "Sweetest Goodbye" with "Sunday Morning."

Score
The film's original score was composed, orchestrated and conducted by Craig Armstrong. It was commercially unreleased until 19 November 2021, when it was released digitally by Universal Pictures' Back Lot Music, and on CD by La-La Land Records.

Certifications

The soundtrack album reached number one on the UK Albums Chart, and by Christmas 2018 it had spent 348 weeks on the Chart. It reached the top forty on the US Billboard 200 in 2004 and ranked second on the Top Soundtracks chart.

Use in film
The UK and US versions of the actual film contain two instances of alternative music. In the UK cut, the montage leading up to and continuing through the first part of the office party is set to the song "Too Lost in You", by the British group Sugababes. In the US version of the film, this song is replaced with "The Trouble with Love Is", performed by the American singer Kelly Clarkson. Subsequently, in the UK version's end credit roll, the second song is a cover of "Jump (For My Love)" performed by Girls Aloud; in the US version, this song is replaced with "Too Lost in You".

Several songs were heard in the film but did not appear on either soundtrack:
 "Bye Bye Baby (Baby Goodbye)" performed by Bay City Rollers
 "Puppy Love" performed by S Club Juniors
 "All I Want for Christmas Is You" performed by Tessa Niles
 "River" performed by Joni Mitchell
 "Rose" from the Titanic score, written by James Horner
 "Like I Love You" performed by Justin Timberlake
 "All Alone on Christmas" performed by Darlene Love
 "Smooth" by Santana featuring Rob Thomas
 "Silent Night" performed by Pre Teens
 "Good King Wenceslas" performed by Hugh Grant (as David) and Andrew Tinkler (as Gavin)
 "Catch a Falling Star" performed by child cast

Reception

Box office
The Working Title Films production, with a budget of $40–45 million, was released by Universal Pictures. It grossed $62.7 million in the United Kingdom, $14 million in Australia and $59.5 million in the US and Canada. It took a worldwide total of $246.2 million.

Critical response
The review aggregation website Rotten Tomatoes reported that 64% of 224 critics gave the film a positive review, with an average rating of 6.4/10. The site's critics consensus states: "A sugary tale overstuffed with too many stories. Still, the cast charms." On Metacritic, the film holds a weighted average score of 55 out of 100, based on 41 critics, indicating "mixed or average reviews". Audiences polled by CinemaScore gave the film an average grade of "B+" on an A+ to F scale.

Todd McCarthy of Variety called it "a roundly entertaining romantic comedy," a "doggedly cheery confection," and "a package that feels as luxuriously appointed and expertly tooled as a Rolls-Royce" and predicted "its cheeky wit, impossibly attractive cast, and sure-handed professionalism ... along with its all-encompassing romanticism should make this a highly popular early holiday attraction for adults on both sides of the pond". 

Michael Atkinson of The Village Voice called it "love British style, handicapped slightly by corny circumstance and populated by colorful neurotics". Roger Ebert of the Chicago Sun-Times gave the film three and a half out of four stars, describing it as "a belly-flop into the sea of romantic comedy ... The movie's only flaw is also a virtue: It's jammed with characters, stories, warmth and laughs, until at times Curtis seems to be working from a checklist of obligatory movie love situations and doesn't want to leave anything out ... It feels a little like a gourmet meal that turns into a hot-dog eating contest." 

Susan Wloszczyna of USA Today wrote "Curtis' multi-tiered cake of comedy, slathered in eye-candy icing and set mostly in London at Christmas, serves sundry slices of love—sad, sweet and silly—in all of their messy, often surprising, glory." Owen Gleiberman of Entertainment Weekly rated it B and called it "a toasty, star-packed ensemble comedy ... [that's] going to make a lot of holiday romantics feel very, very good; watching it; I felt cozy and charmed myself." 

Nev Pierce of the BBC awarded it four of a possible five stars and called it a "vibrant romantic comedy ... Warm, bittersweet and hilarious, this is lovely, actually. Prepare to be smitten." Carla Meyer of the San Francisco Chronicle opined "[it] abandons any pretext of sophistication for gloppy sentimentality, sugary pop songs and bawdy humor – an approach that works about half the time ... most of the story lines maintain interest because of the fine cast and general goodwill of the picture."

In his review in The New York Times, journalist A. O. Scott called it "a romantic comedy swollen to the length of an Oscar-trawling epic – nearly two and a quarter hours of cheekiness, diffidence and high-tone smirking" and added, "it is more like a record label's greatest-hits compilation or a very special sitcom clip-reel show than an actual movie. ... the film's governing idea of love is both shallow and dishonest, and its sweet, chipper demeanor masks a sour cynicism about human emotions that is all the more sleazy for remaining unacknowledged. It has the calloused, leering soul of an early-60s rat-pack comedy, but without the suave, seductive bravado. ... It is disturbing to see [Emma] Thompson's range and subtlety so shamelessly trashed, and to see Laura Linney's intelligence similarly abused as a lonely, frustrated do-gooder. The fate of their characters suggests that women who are not young, pert secretaries or household workers have no real hope of sexual fulfillment and can find only a compromised, damaged form of love."

In Rolling Stone, Peter Travers rated it two stars out of a possible four, saying "there are laughs laced with feeling here, but the deft screenwriter Richard Curtis dilutes the impact by tossing in more and more stories. As a director ... Curtis can't seem to rein in his writer. ... He ladles sugar over the eager-to-please Love Actually to make it go down easy, forgetting that sometimes it just makes you gag." Christopher Orr of The Atlantic was negative toward the work and described it as the least romantic movie of all time, considering its ultimate message to be "It's probably best if you give up on love altogether and get on with the rest of your life."

Although critics' response to Love Actually was mixed, the film is popular among audiences and has been discussed as an arguable modern-day Christmas classic.

Accolades

Other adaptations
The screenplay by Richard Curtis was published by Michael Joseph Ltd. in the United Kingdom and by St. Martin's Griffin in the US.

Red Nose Day Actually

In 2017, Richard Curtis wrote a script for Red Nose Day  which reunited a dozen characters and picked up their storylines fourteen years later. Filming began in February 2017, and the short film was broadcast on BBC One on 24 March 2017.

See also
 List of Christmas films
 Love Is All (Dutch: Alles is Liefde), 2007 Dutch romantic comedy film inspired by Love Actually
 Salute To Love (Hindi: Salaam-e-Ishq), 2007 Indian film based on Love Actually
 He's Just Not That Into You, 2009 American romantic comedy film with multiple protagonists and stories similar to Love Actually.
 New Year Trees (Russian: Yolki), also known as Six Degrees of Celebration, 2010 comedy film that launched a successful movie franchise spanning six sequels
 Letters to Santa (Polish: Listy do M.), 2011 Polish film inspired by Love Actually
 "Glee, Actually", 2012 holiday episode from the fourth season of the American musical television series Glee    
 It All Began When I Met You, 2013 Japanese film inspired by Love Actually
 List of fictional prime ministers of the United Kingdom

References

External links

 
 
 
 
 
 

2000s Christmas comedy-drama films
2003 romantic comedy-drama films
2003 films
American Christmas comedy-drama films
American romantic comedy-drama films
British Christmas comedy-drama films
British romantic comedy-drama films
DNA Films films
2000s English-language films
Films directed by Richard Curtis
Films produced by Eric Fellner
Films produced by Tim Bevan
Films scored by Craig Armstrong (composer)
Films set in London
Films set in Marseille
Films shot in London
Portuguese-language films
Films with screenplays by Richard Curtis
StudioCanal films
Working Title Films films
2003 directorial debut films
Films about writers
2000s American films
2000s British films
Hyperlink films